Kevin Gerard Bearse (born November 7, 1965) is an American former professional baseball pitcher who played for the Cleveland Indians of Major League Baseball (MLB) for three games during the 1990 season.

Amateur career
Bearse attended Old Dominion University, and in 1984 he played collegiate summer baseball with the Orleans Cardinals of the Cape Cod Baseball League. Bearse set Old Dominion and Sun Belt Conference records in strikeouts and complete games. In 1995, he was inducted into the school's athletics hall of fame. He was selected by the Indians in the 22nd round of the 1987 MLB Draft.

Professional career
He led the Carolina League with 22 saves for Kinston Indians. He recorded a spring training save for the Indians on April 2, 1989 with a hitless ninth inning against the Cincinnati Reds. He made his regular season debut for Cleveland the following season.

Personal
He currently is a Physical Education teacher at Marlboro Memorial Middle School in Marlboro, New Jersey. He has worked there for 18 years.

References

External links

1965 births
Living people
Cleveland Indians players
Canton-Akron Indians players
Indianapolis Indians players
Scranton/Wilkes-Barre Red Barons players
Kinston Indians players
Old Dominion Monarchs baseball players
Orleans Firebirds players
Colorado Springs Sky Sox players
Burlington Indians players (1986–2006)
Baseball players from Jersey City, New Jersey